Sense and Nonsense is an American game show hosted by Bob Kennedy which ran on New York City TV station WABD from 1951 to 1954. The show consisted of two three-child teams using their five senses to complete challenges and earn money, with the high-scoring team returning on the next show.

Sponsored by Coca-Cola (specifically "Coke in-a-bottle"), and with a somewhat-unorthodox Monday-Wednesday-Friday airing schedule, Sense has since gained something of a "cult following" among fans of early television. While only shown on WABD, it is often considered a DuMont Television Network program due to not only being on the network's flagship affiliate, but having several production "quirks" typical of many DuMont programs.

Gallery

Episode status
Only one episode is known to exist, from February 19, 1954 (one commercial mentions the upcoming weekend and celebrating George Washington's birthday with Coke in-a-bottle, showing a boy and girl doing so in Colonial attire and powdered wigs). Among other things, the episode is notable for a young Leonard Frey playing on the challenging team.

This episode is held by the UCLA Film and Television Archive, but can be purchased on DVD through various public-domain retailers and is available for viewing on the Internet Archive.

See also
 List of programs broadcast by the DuMont Television Network
 List of surviving DuMont Television Network broadcasts

External links
 Sense and Nonsense at the Internet Archive

1951 American television series debuts
1954 American television series endings
1950s American children's television series
1950s American children's game shows
Local game shows in the United States
Black-and-white American television shows
English-language television shows
DuMont Television Network original programming
Local television programming in the United States
Lost television shows